My Heart Can't Beat Unless You Tell It To is a 2020 American psychological horror drama film written and directed by Jonathan Cuartas and starring Patrick Fugit, Ingrid Sophie Schram, and Owen Campbell.

Plot
A woman, Jessie, and her brother, Dwight, care for their chronically ill younger sibling, Thomas, who is unable to venture outdoors during the day and must regularly drink blood to survive. Dwight and Jessie provide blood for Thomas by routinely murdering strangers, mainly homeless people and drifters. Jessie works as a waitress in a local diner, while Dwight spends his days pawning items he finds around town and visiting a prostitute who he pays extra for a few minutes conversation after their liaisons.

After a particularly grisly murder, Dwight begs Jessie to get real medical help for Thomas. She refuses and instead orders Dwight to procure a new victim. He lures a Spanish-speaking migrant named Eduardo into his car, but Eduardo escapes and wounds Dwight with a screwdriver when Dwight attempts to strangle him. Dwight subdues Eduardo after a fight in the forest, but the latter's desperate pleas for mercy convince Dwight to spare him. He restrains Eduardo in a shed in his backyard.

Jessie hunts and kills the prostitute that Dwight had befriended, leaving him distraught. That night, Thomas complains of loneliness at the dinner table and implores Jessie to let him socialize with the local children he hears outside his window. When she refuses, he overturns his bowl of blood, infuriating his sister. In an attempt to make contact with the outside world, Thomas writes a note on a paper airplane and opens the front door to hurl it at a group of passing teenagers. Dwight appears behind him and quickly covers him with a blanket, but not before Thomas sustains severe burns on his arm. That night, Eduardo escapes the shed and attempts to kill Dwight, but he fights back and kills Eduardo in front of Thomas.

Later, one of the teenage boys who found Thomas' note comes to the house while Jessie is away looking for a fresh body. Thomas invites him in and tries to connect with the boy by offering him blood to drink and playing a game that involves guessing the release year of songs Thomas plays on the piano. When Dwight enters the kitchen and discovers the boy, Dwight threatens him but is unable to kill him. Hearing Jessie return with a new victim, Dwight shoves the boy into a closet and orders him to be quiet. When Jessie finds him within the closet the boy stabs her with a kitchen knife and flees. Although bleeding heavily, Jessie orders Dwight to pursue and kill the boy.

Dwight finds the boy but spares him. He returns home to find Jessie dead in the bathtub and Thomas consuming her blood. Dwight forces Thomas out of the bathroom and locks him in a room with the dead man Jessie had brought back earlier. Dwight then buries Jessie in an outdoor grave.

In the morning, Dwight packs his things and tells Thomas he is leaving and never coming back. Soon he has a change of heart after seeing a happy family at the diner. Back at home, Thomas apologizes for his role in Jessie's death and the two brothers embrace and cry together. Thomas then asks Dwight to remove the cardboard covering the window. Dwight does so, and Thomas is killed.

Alone, Dwight drives across the country and finally arrives at a beach, where he stands on the rocks above the water and smiles.

Cast
 Patrick Fugit as Dwight
 Owen Campbell as Thomas
 Ingrid Sophie Schram as Jessie

Production
Principal photography began in May 2019 in Salt Lake City.
The film was scheduled to have its world premiere at the 19th Tribeca Film Festival in April 2020 before the festival was postponed because of the COVID-19 pandemic (COVID-19).

Release
In September 2020, it was announced that Dark Sky Films acquired U.S. distribution rights to the film.

Reception
Bobby LePire of Film Threat gave the film a 7 out of 10.

References

External links
 

2020s Spanish-language films
American horror films
Films postponed due to the COVID-19 pandemic
Films shot in Salt Lake City
2020 films
2020 horror films
2020s English-language films
2020 multilingual films
American multilingual films
2020s American films